Ronald Campbell (born 14 August 1943) is a former British Labour Party politician who was Member of Parliament (MP) for Blyth Valley from 1987 until 2019.

Early life
Campbell was born in Tynemouth, and grew up with seven siblings. He attended Blyth Ridley County High School, a secondary modern, and left school at 14 to become a coal miner. Before entering parliament he was a councillor for Croft Ward, Blyth Borough, Northumberland from 1969 and a lay official of the National Union of Mineworkers (NUM). He was a miner from 1958–86. Campbell led picket lines in the 1984–85 miners' strike and was arrested twice.

Parliamentary career
Campbell was first elected as an MP for Blyth Valley at the 1987 general election with a majority of 853 votes. He often voted against the Blair government on issues such as the Iraq War. He is an outspoken socialist. When the government nationalised Northern Rock in 2008, Campbell declared it "the People's Bank" and opened an account.

In May 2009, during the high-profile MPs expenses scandal, Campbell agreed to return over £6,000 of the £87,729 he had claimed for furnishings in his London home.

Campbell voted for Andy Burnham in the 2010 Labour Party leadership election following the resignation of Gordon Brown. He was critical of Ed Miliband's leadership of the Labour Party, referring to him as a "right winger". In 2013, he was one of 22 Labour MPs to vote against same-sex marriage, out of 255.

Upon re-election in May 2015, Campbell announced that he would stand down at the next general election, although this did not materialise.

Campbell was one of 36 Labour MPs to nominate Jeremy Corbyn as a candidate in the Labour leadership election of 2015 and one of a handful of Labour MPs to publicly support leaving the European Union. Campbell continued to support Brexit, and to vote against attempts to delay it, in subsequent parliamentary votes. He justified this by noting that "I am a leaver, and I always have been. MPs are elected, unlike the EU bureaucrats, and if people don't like how MPs vote then they can get rid of us and that's how it should work."

Campbell was one of 13 MPs to vote against triggering the 2017 general election. Having previously said he would stand down at the next election, he changed his mind, stating: "It was my intention to stand down at the next general election, however due to circumstances following the announcement of the snap election I have decided to stand again for Blyth Valley."

In June 2019, Campbell confirmed that he would stand down as an MP in the following election, which was later confirmed for December 2019. He subsequently said he would back the Conservative government's deal to leave the European Union.

Campbell was a member of the Socialist Campaign group, a socialist, left-wing group of Labour MPs.

Personal life
Campbell married Deirdre McHale in 1967, who serves on Northumberland County Council. They have five sons, including a set of twins, and one daughter. While he served as an MP, Campbell had a reunion with his half-brother, Eric McGraw, whom he had not known due to the latter's adoption.

In September 2016, Campbell underwent chemotherapy after being diagnosed with stomach cancer. He returned to Parliament on 30 November 2016 and was welcomed back during Prime Minister's Questions.

His interests include horse racing.

References

External links
 
 Guardian Unlimited Politics – Ask Aristotle: Ronnie Campbell MP
 Meeting his unknown brother in 2006
 BBC Politics

News items
 Northumberland County Council with £11m in Lehman Brothers in October 2008
 Hairdresser in Cumbria with the same name gets his emails in November 2003
 His son in the Royal Marines in March 2003
 Cleared of assault in May 2002
 Shoplifter given £10,000 trial over 92p tin of spaghetti bolognese in May 2002
 Suspended from the Commons in March 1998

1943 births
Living people
British socialists
Labour Party (UK) MPs for English constituencies
National Union of Mineworkers-sponsored MPs
UK MPs 1987–1992
UK MPs 1992–1997
UK MPs 1997–2001
UK MPs 2001–2005
UK MPs 2005–2010
UK MPs 2010–2015
UK MPs 2015–2017
UK MPs 2017–2019
People from Blyth, Northumberland
British Eurosceptics
People from Tynemouth
Politicians from Tyne and Wear
British republicans